Jagapathi Babu is an Indian actor who predominantly appears in Telugu-languages films. He made his debut in Telugu with the Simha Swapnam (1989) which was produced by his father and directed by V. Madhusudhana Rao.  His first commercial success film is Peddarikam released in 1992.  He had his breakthrough in Gaayam directed by Ram Gopal Varma in 1993. In 1994, through Subha Lagnam he established his stardom. He won the Nandi Award for Best Actor in 1996 for his role in Maavichiguru directed by S V Krishna Reddy.

His first Tamil was Madrasi, and in 2011, he appeared as the antagonist in Tamil film Thaandavam. Subsequently, he played the lead role in Jai Bolo Telangana, which won five Nandi Awards. In 2012, he debuted in the Kannada film Bachchan as a cop. In 2016, he made his Malayalam debut Pulimurugan as an antagonist.

In August, 2015, an autobiographical TV series Samudram was announced which also marks his debut in television.

Acting roles

Telugu

Other languages

Narrator

Dubbing artist

Notes

References

Indian filmographies
Male actor filmographies